Duabanga moluccana is a species of tree native to Indonesia and surrounding areas. Its common names include kalanggo (Indonesia) loktob (Philippines) and magas (Malaysia).

References

External links
Trees of Papua New Guinea
Floristic composition of forest composition at Mahua, Crocker Range National Park, Sabah.

moluccana
Plants described in 1850